The Federation of Electrical Workers' Unions of Japan (Denroren) was a trade union representing workers in the power generation industry in Japan.

The union was established in 1954 by various local unions, most of which had previously been affiliated with the Japan Electric Industry Labor Union, which was dissolved in 1952.  It was a founding affiliate of the Japanese Confederation of Labour and by 1967, it had 128,939 members.  In 1981, it merged into a new organization, The Federation of Electric Power Related Industry Workers' Unions of Japan.

References

Energy industry trade unions
Trade unions established in 1954
Trade unions disestablished in 1981
Trade unions in Japan